Ascotheca is a genus of flowering plants belonging to the family Acanthaceae.

Its native range is Southern Nigeria to Western Central Tropical Africa.

Species:

Ascotheca paucinervia

References

Acanthaceae
Acanthaceae genera